Veselin Ganev (born 15 September 1987) is a Bulgarian footballer who plays as a goalkeeper for Septemvri Simitli.

Career
After spending 3 years at Pirin Blagoevgrad as a second choice goalkeeper, Veselin signed with Arda Kardzhali on 2 July 2017.

References

External links

1987 births
Living people
Bulgarian footballers
First Professional Football League (Bulgaria) players
OFC Pirin Blagoevgrad players
PFC Pirin Blagoevgrad players
FC Bansko players
FC Arda Kardzhali players
OFC Vihren Sandanski players
FC Septemvri Simitli players
Macedonian Bulgarians
Association football goalkeepers
Sportspeople from Blagoevgrad